The Court Concert is a 1948 German musical comedy film written and directed by Paul Verhoeven and starring Elfie Mayerhofer, Hans Nielsen and Erich Ponto. In the United States it was released as Palace Scandal.

It is based on the 1935 musical comedy The Court Concert (music: Edmund Nick) which Verhoeven had co-written. A previous film version was made in 1936 and directed by Douglas Sirk. The remake was shot using agfacolor. Both productions are in the tradition of operetta films.

It was produced by the major studio Tobis Film during 1944, but was not given a formal release until 1948 in Sweden and then East and West Germany the following year.

The art director Otto Erdmann worked on the film's sets. Location shooting took place in Bavaria.

Cast

See also
Überläufer

References

External links

1948 musical comedy films
German musical comedy films
East German films
West German films
Films directed by Paul Verhoeven (Germany)
Tobis Film films
Films set in Bavaria
Operetta films
Films based on operettas
Remakes of German films
Films set in the 19th century
1940s German-language films
1940s German films